Long Khot is a tambon (subdistrict) of Phrao District, in Chiang Mai Province, Thailand. In 2014 it had a population of 4,640 people.

Administration

Central administration
The tambon is divided into nine administrative villages (mubans).

Local administration
The area of the subdistrict is covered by the subdistrict administrative organization (SAO) Long Khot (องค์การบริหารส่วนตำบลโหล่งขอด)

References

External links
Thaitambon.com on Long Khot

Tambon of Chiang Mai province
Populated places in Chiang Mai province